Walter Charles Fletcher (born December 17, 1996) is an American professional Canadian football running back for the Montreal Alouettes of the Canadian Football League (CFL). Fletcher played college football at Edinboro University of Pennsylvania and Ball State. He made his professional football debut in 2021 as a member of the Edmonton Elks.

High school career
Fletcher was an all-state selection in football at Centennial High School. Fletcher was a three-year starter, rushing for 1,736 (236 carries) yards and 24 touchdowns as a senior. He was also named to First Team All-Howard County. Fletcher set school records for rushing yards in a single game (306) and single season (1,736). Fletcher was named second team All-County as a junior. He finishes his career with 2,955 career rushing yards (program record) and 29 career touchdowns. 

In 2014, Fletched attended a post-graduate school named East Coast Prep located in Great Barrington, Massachusetts for 3 months. Concluding the season , Fletcher enrolled in NCAA Division III's Randolph-Macon College in the spring of 2015 and later transferred to NCAA Division II's Edinboro University of Pennsylvania for the fall semester of 2015 as a walk-on.

College career 
Fletcher played three years at Edinboro University of Pennsylvania (Division II), member of NCAA Division II's Pennsylvania State Athletic Conference. After his sophomore year, he ran for a school-record 1,740 yards on 253 carries, which ranks fifth in a season. Fletcher ranked second in NCAA Division II in rushing yards, along with ranking second nationally in rushing yards per game (158.2 ypg.) Fletcher scored 18 touchdowns rushing and added three touchdowns receiving for 21 total touchdowns. He rushed for 100-or-more yards in eight of 11 games, including a school-record four games with 200-or-more yards. 

Concluding his junior season, Fletcher was named 2018's PSAC West Offensive Player of the Year. He was the first player to do so since Trevor Harris in 2008. Fletcher concluded his 3 seasons with 632 carries, 3,913 yards (6.2 ypc) and 41 touchdowns. He also added 93 receptions, 692 yards and 6 receiving touchdowns. He holds school records for yards in a season, single game (328), career points (288), most 200 yard games in a season, career running back receptions and Edinboro University's first ever 100 rushing/100 receiving game. He ranks 3rd all-time in career rushing yards and a 2nd in career touchdowns. 

As a graduate transfer, Fletcher enrolled to play for the Ball State Cardinals in 2019. Fletcher finished with 1,032 offensive all-purpose yardage in his lone season with the Cardinals. He had 132 rushing attempts for 726 yards (5.5 ypc) with five rushing touchdowns. Fletcher also caught 26 passes for 306 yards and two touchdowns.

Professional career

Edmonton Elks 
After going undrafted in the 2020 NFL Draft Fletcher signed with the Edmonton Elks of the Canadian Football League (CFL) on December 31, 2020. During the 2021 season Fletcher played in 11 games and carried the ball 67 times for 302 yards. He also caught 22 passes for 177 yards. Fletcher was selected as one of the Elk players to debut the team's new uniform designs for the 2022 season.

Montreal Alouettes 
Following an injury to their incumbent starting running back, William Stanback, the Montreal Alouettes traded for Fletcher on June 14, 2022, in exchange for a sixth-round pick in the 2023 CFL Draft. He played in 14 regular season games for the team, starting in six, where he had 85 carries for 486 yards with one touchdown and 29 receptions for 353 yards and one receiving touchdown.

References

External links 
 Ball State Cardinals bio
 Montreal Alouettes bio

Living people
1996 births
American football running backs
Canadian football running backs
Edmonton Elks players
Ball State Cardinals football players
Edinboro Fighting Scots football players
Montreal Alouettes players